Charles Haddon Spurgeon (19 June 1834 – 31 January 1892) was an English Particular Baptist preacher.

Spurgeon remains highly influential among Christians of various denominations, among whom he is known as the "Prince of Preachers". He was a strong figure in the Reformed Baptist tradition, defending the 1689 London Baptist Confession of Faith, and opposing the liberal and pragmatic theological tendencies in the Church of his day.

Spurgeon was pastor of the congregation of the New Park Street Chapel (later the Metropolitan Tabernacle) in London for 38 years. He was part of several controversies with the Baptist Union of Great Britain and later he left the denomination over doctrinal convictions.

While at the Metropolitan Tabernacle he built an Almshouse, the Stockwell Orphanage and encouraged his congregation to engage actively with the poor of Victorian London. He also founded Spurgeon's College, which was named after him posthumously.

Spurgeon authored sermons, an autobiography, commentaries, books on prayer, devotionals, magazines, poetry, and hymns. Many sermons were transcribed as he spoke and were translated into many languages during his lifetime.  He is said to have produced powerful sermons of penetrating thought and precise exposition. His oratory skills are said to have held his listeners spellbound in the Metropolitan Tabernacle, and many Christians hold his writings in exceptionally high regard among devotional literature.

Biography

Early life

Born in Kelvedon, Essex, he moved to Colchester at 10 months old. Spurgeon's conversion from nominal Congregationalism came on 6 January 1850, at age 15. On his way to a scheduled appointment, a snowstorm forced him to cut short his intended journey and to turn into a Primitive Methodist chapel in Artillery Street, Newtown, Colchester, where he believed God opened his heart to the salvation message. 
The text that moved him was Isaiah 45:22 ("Look unto me, and be ye saved, all the ends of the earth, for I am God, and there is none else"). Later that year, on 4 April, he was admitted to the church at Newmarket. His baptism followed on 3 May in the river Lark, at Isleham. Later that same year he moved to Cambridge, where he later became a Sunday school teacher. Spurgeon preached his first sermon in the winter of 1850–51 in a cottage at Teversham while filling in for a friend. From the beginning of Spurgeon's ministry, his style and ability were considered to be far above average. In the same year, he was installed as pastor of the small Baptist church at Waterbeach, Cambridgeshire, where he published his first literary work, a Gospel tract written in 1853.

New Park Street Chapel

In April 1854, after preaching three months on probation and just four years after his conversion, Spurgeon, then only 19 years old, was called to the pastorate of London's famed New Park Street Chapel in Southwark (formerly pastored by the Particular Baptists Benjamin Keach, and theologian John Gill).  This was the largest Baptist congregation in London at the time, although it had dwindled in numbers for several years. Spurgeon found friends in London among his fellow pastors, such as William Garrett Lewis of Westballs Grove Church, an older man who along with Spurgeon went on to found the London Baptist Association. 

Within a few months of Spurgeon's arrival at Park Street, his ability as a preacher made him famous. The following year the first of his sermons in the "New Park Street Pulpit" was published. Spurgeon's sermons were published in printed form every week and had a high circulation. By the time of his death in 1892, he had preached nearly 3,600 sermons and published 49 volumes of commentaries, sayings, anecdotes, illustrations and devotions.

Immediately following his fame was criticism. The first attack in the press appeared in the Earthen Vessel in January 1855. His preaching, although not revolutionary in substance, was a plain-spoken and direct appeal to the people, using the Bible to provoke them to consider the teachings of Jesus Christ. Critical attacks from the media persisted throughout his life. The congregation quickly outgrew their building, and moved to Exeter Hall, then to Surrey Music Hall.  At 22, Spurgeon was the most popular preacher of the day.
 
On 8 January 1869, Spurgeon married Susannah, daughter of Robert Thompson of Falcon Square, London, by whom he had twin sons, Charles and Thomas born on September 20, 1856. At the end of that year, tragedy struck on 19 October 1856, as Spurgeon was preaching at the Surrey Gardens Music Hall for the first time. Someone in the crowd yelled, "FIRE"  The ensuing panic and stampede left several dead. Spurgeon was emotionally impacted by the event and it had a sobering influence on his life. For many years he spoke of being moved to tears for no reason known to himself.

Walter Thornbury later wrote in "Old and New London" (1898) describing a subsequent meeting at Surrey:

Spurgeon's work went on. A Pastors' College was founded in 1856 by Spurgeon and was renamed Spurgeon's College in 1923, when it moved to its present building in South Norwood Hill, London. At the Fast Day, 7 October 1857, he preached to the largest crowd ever – 23,654 people – at The Crystal Palace in London. Spurgeon noted:

Metropolitan Tabernacle

On 18 March 1861, the congregation moved permanently to the newly constructed purpose-built Metropolitan Tabernacle at Elephant and Castle, Southwark, seating 5,000 people with standing room for another 1,000. The Metropolitan Tabernacle was the largest church edifice of its day. Spurgeon continued to preach there several times per week until his death 31 years later. He never gave altar calls at the conclusion of his sermons, but he always extended the invitation that if anyone was moved to seek an interest in Christ by his preaching on a Sunday, they could meet with him at his vestry on Monday morning. Without fail, there was always someone at his door the next day.

He wrote his sermons out fully before he preached, but what he carried up to the pulpit was a note card with an outline sketch. Stenographers would take down the sermon as it was delivered and Spurgeon would then have opportunity to make revisions to the transcripts the following day for immediate publication. His weekly sermons, which sold for a penny each, were widely circulated and still remain one of the all-time best selling series of writings published in history.

Besides sermons, Spurgeon also wrote several hymns and published a new collection of worship songs in 1866 called "Our Own Hymn Book". It was mostly a compilation of Isaac Watts's Psalms and Hymns that had been originally selected by John Rippon, a Baptist predecessor to Spurgeon. Singing in the congregation was exclusively a cappella under his pastorate. Thousands heard the preaching and were led in the singing without any amplification of sound that exists today. Hymns were a subject that he took seriously. While Spurgeon was still preaching at New Park Street, he entered the Rivulet controversy over a hymn book. He found its theology largely deistic. At the end of his review, he warned:

We shall soon have to handle truth, not with kid gloves, but with gauntlets, – the gauntlets of holy courage and integrity. Go on, ye warriors of the cross, for the King is at the head of you.

On 5 June 1862, Spurgeon challenged the Church of England when he preached against baptismal regeneration. However, Spurgeon taught across denominational lines as well: for example, in 1877 he was the preacher at the opening of a new Free Church of Scotland church building in Dingwall. It was during this period at the new Tabernacle that Spurgeon found a friend in James Hudson Taylor, the founder of the inter-denominational China Inland Mission. Spurgeon supported the work of the mission financially and directed many missionary candidates to apply for service with Taylor. He also aided in the work of cross-cultural evangelism by promoting "The Wordless Book", a teaching tool that he described in a message given on 11 January 1866, regarding Psalm 51:7: "Wash me, and I shall be whiter than snow." The book has been and is still used to teach people without reading skills and people of other cultures and languages –  young and old – around the globe about the Gospel message.

On the death of missionary David Livingstone in 1873, a discolored and much-used copy of one of Spurgeon's printed sermons, "Accidents, Not Punishments," was found among his few possessions much later, along with the handwritten comment at the top of the first page: "Very good, D.L." He had carried it with him throughout his travels in Africa. It was sent to Spurgeon and treasured by him.

Metropolitan Tabernacle Societies and Institutions
In 1876, 22 years after becoming pastor, Spurgeon published "The Metropolitan Tabernacle: Its History and Work". His intention stated in the preface is to give a 'printed history of the Tabernacle'.The book has 15 chapters and of these 5 are given over to what he called 'Societies and Institutions'.

The Five Chapters are:

xi. The Almshouses. Explaining how the New Park Street Chapel site was sold to allow the Tabernacle to build an Almshouse and school.
 

xiii. The Stockwell Orphanage. This opened for 240 boys in 1867 (and later for girls in 1879). These orphanages continued in London until they were bombed in the Second World War. The inspiration for starting an orphanage came from a visit with George Müller. The orphanage changed its name to Spurgeon's Child Care in 1937, and again in 2005 to Spurgeons. Spurgeon was linked more with the Stockwell orphanage than any other Metropolitan Tabernacle endeavour. There are probably four reasons for this:

xiv. The Colportage Association. Colporters were employed to take Bibles, good books and periodicals for sale, from  house to house. They also were involved in visiting the sick and holding meetings.

xv. Other Institutions Connected with the Tabernacle. Here Spurgeon describes 21 other 'Institutions'. Two examples are: The Ordinance Poor Fund which distributed money amongst poor members of the church of about £800 annually, and the Ladies' Benevolent Society. This group made clothing for the poor and 'relieved' them, with an income of £105.

Eight years later at Spurgeon's fiftieth birthday celebration an updated list of 'Societies and Institutions' was read out. With Spurgeon's strong encouragement and support the 24 groups listed in 'The Metropolitan Tabernacle: Its History and Work', had become 69. Before they are read out Spurgeon says:  "I think everybody should know what the church has been moved to do, and I beg to say that there are other societies besides those which will be mentioned, but you will be tired before you get to the end of them." and finishes after the list by saying: "We have need to praise God that he enables the church to carry on all these institutions."

Spurgeon's encouragement for members of the Tabernacle to be involved in these ministries was very strong. Spurgeon's own regular contributions to them meant that he left his wife only 2,000 pounds, when he died, despite having earned millions from his published sermons and books.

He encouraged others to give with comments like these:

On the Green Walk Mission: "Here a good hall must be built. If some generous friend would build a place for this mission, the money would be well laid out",

On colporters: "Mr Charlesworth’s two Bible classes have generously agreed to support a brother with a Bible Carriage in the streets of London. Would not some other communities of young people do well to have their own man at work in the regions where they dwell? THINK OF IT",

On the almshouses: "WE GREATLY NEED AT LEAST £5000 TO ENDOW THE ALMHOUSES, AND PLACE THE INSTITUTION UPON A PROPER FOOTING. Already C. H. Spurgeon, Thomas Olney, and Thomas Greenwood have contributed £200 each towards the fund, and we earnestly trust that either by donations or legacies the rest of the £5000 will be forthcoming."

Spurgeon had one Infirmary built, at the Stockwell Orphanage. However, he also recognised that the poor had limited access to health care and so was also an enthusiastic supporter of the Metropolitan Hospital Sunday Fund. He left us this quote:

Downgrade controversy

A controversy among the Baptists flared in 1887 with Spurgeon's first "Down-grade" article, published in The Sword & the Trowel. In the ensuing "Downgrade Controversy," the Metropolitan Tabernacle disaffiliated from the Baptist Union, effectuating Spurgeon's congregation as the world's largest self-standing church. Spurgeon framed the controversy in this way:

The Controversy took its name from Spurgeon's use of the term "Downgrade" to describe certain other Baptists' outlook toward the Bible (i.e., they had "downgraded" the Bible and the principle of sola scriptura). Spurgeon alleged that an incremental creeping of the Graf-Wellhausen hypothesis, Charles Darwin's theory of evolution, and other concepts were weakening the Baptist Union. Spurgeon emphatically decried the doctrine that resulted: 

The standoff caused division amongst the Baptists and other non-conformists, and is regarded by many as an important paradigm.

Opposition to slavery

Spurgeon strongly opposed the owning of slaves. He lost support from the Southern Baptists, sales of his sermons dropped, and he received scores of threatening and insulting letters as a consequence.

In a letter to the Christian Watchman and Reflector (Boston), Spurgeon declared:

Restorationism
Like other Baptists of his time, despite opposing Dispensationalism, Spurgeon anticipated the restoration of the Jews to inhabit the Promised Land.

Final years and death

Spurgeon's wife was often too ill to leave home to hear him preach.

Spurgeon had a long history of poor health. He was already being reported as having gout when he was 33.

By 1871, when he was 37 he was already being advised by his doctors to leave town for his health.

His favourite place to go to rest was Menton in the South of France. He was often there in the winter months. He was there often enough to have visitors, with George Müller visiting in 1879 and members of the Baptist Union in 1887, attempting to get him to rejoin the Union.

When he was on the improve in Menton he would preach in the local church, or write, such as in 1890 when he wrote a commentary on Matthew while ‘resting’.

He became increasingly unwell and in May 1891 he was forced 'to rest'. In 1891 he went to rest in Menton, and remained there three months. During this period he wrote 180 pages of commentary. However, he did not recover and died aged 57, while still in Menton, from gout and congestion of the kidneys. From May 1891 until his death in January 1892 he received 10,000 letters of 'condolence, resolutions of sympathy, telegrams of enquiry'.

After returning the body to England it lay in state in the Metropolitan Tabernacle.

Two days prior to the funeral, four memorial services where held at the Metropolitan Tabernacle. The first service at 11am was for those with current communion cards, the second at 3pm was for ministers and student pastors, the third at 7pm was for Christians who hadn't gotten in yet and the final service at 11pm included the Stockwell Orphans. Police controlled the crowds waiting to get in during the day, and to help with order, at the end of services people left through a back door.

On the day of the funeral eight hundred extra police were on duty along the route the cortège took, from the Metropolitan Tabernacle, past the Stockwell Orphanage and to the Norwood Cemetery. Accounts vary about the number of carriages in the cortege. One account puts it as: 

Extra trains were put on to cater for the crowd, along with extra omnibuses and cabs. Except for a few tobacco shops and taverns, the businesses along the funeral route were shut, with some houses displaying black and white material. An estimated total of 100,000 people either passed by Spurgeon as he lay in state or attended the funeral services. An unknown number lined the streets for the cortége. As the cortége passed the Stockwell Orphanage it stopped briefly while the children sang a verse of one of his favourite hymns “For ever with the Lord,” with the refrain “Nearer home.”. Along the route some flags were at half staff.

Spurgeon was survived by his wife and sons. His remains were buried at West Norwood Cemetery in London, where the tomb is still visited by admirers. His son Tom became the pastor of the Metropolitan Tabernacle after his father died.

Library
William Jewell College in Liberty, Missouri, purchased Spurgeon's 5,103-volume library collection for £500 ($2500) in 1906. The collection was purchased by Midwestern Baptist Theological Seminary in Kansas City, Missouri, in 2006 for $400,000 and can be seen on display at the Spurgeon Center on the campus of Midwestern Seminary. A special collection of Spurgeon's handwritten sermon notes and galley proofs from 1879 to 1891 resides at Samford University in Birmingham, Alabama. Spurgeon's College in London also has a small number of notes and proofs.
Spurgeon's personal Bible, with his handwritten notes is on display in the library of the Southern Baptist Theological Seminary in Louisville, KY.

Works

 Cheer For Daily Life: One of the rarest works, printed in 1898 with only three copies printed, and barely referenced in history. One reference can be found in the-annual-American-catalogue 1898 "Cheer for Life" Rare work Referenced 
 2200 Quotations from the Writings of Charles H. Spurgeon
 Able to the Uttermost
 According To Promise
 All of Grace : 
 An All Round Ministry
 Around the Wicket Gate
 Barbed Arrows
 C. H. Spurgeon's Autobiography : 
 Chequebook of the Bank of Faith : 
 Christ's Incarnation
 Come Ye Children
 Commenting and Commentaries
 The Dawn of Revival, (Prayer Speedily Answered)
 Down Grade Controversy, The
 Eccentric Preachers
 Faith (1856, republished in 1903 as Faith: What it is and what it Leads to)
 Feathers For Arrows
 Flashes of Thought
 Gleanings Among The Sheaves
 God Promises You : 
 Good Start, A
 Greatest Fight in the World, The
 Home Worship and the Use of the Bible in the Home
 Interpreter, The or Scripture for Family Worship
 John Ploughman's Pictures
 John Ploughman's Talks
 Lectures to My Students : 
 Metropolitan Tabernacle Pulpit, The

 Miracles and Parables of Our Lord
 Morning & Evening : 
 New Park Street Pulpit, The
 Only A Prayer Meeting
 Our Own Hymn Book
 Pictures From Pilgrim's Progress
 The Power of Prayer in a Believer's Life : 
 The Preachers Power and the Conditions of Obtaining it
 Saint And His Saviour, The
 Sermons in Candles
 Sermons on Special Days and Occasions
 Smooth Stones taken from Ancient Brooks – Selections from Thomas Brooks : 
 Soul Winner, The : 
 Speeches at Home And Abroad
 Spurgeon's Commentary on Great Chapters of the Bible
 Spurgeon's Morning and Evening
 Spurgeon's Sermon Notes : 
 Sword and The Trowel, The
 Talk to Farmers 
 Till He Come
 The Two Wesleys: On John and Charles Wesley.   : 
 The Salt Cellars (1885)
 Treasury of David, The : 
 We Endeavour
 The Wordless Book
 Word and Spirit : 
 Words of Advice
 Words of Cheer
 Words of Counsel
 Words of Wisdom

Spurgeon's works have been translated into many languages and Moon's and Braille type for the blind. He also wrote many volumes of commentaries and other types of literature.

Notes

References

Further reading

Source of info from Charles H. Spurgeon
 .
 .

Others
 
 Brackney, William H. A Genetic History of Baptist Thought: With Special Reference to Baptists in Britain and North America. Macon, GA: Mercer University Press, 2004. 
 
 
 
 , 700 pp.
 , 192 pp.

External links

 Spurgeon archive available in many languages
 Through the Eyes of Spurgeon - Official Documentary on the Life and Ministry of Charles Spurgeon
 
 
 
 Metropolitan Tabernacle – The present Metropolitan Tabernacle seeks to honour the principles honoured by Charles Spurgeon.
 More information on Charles Spurgeon
 Spurgeon Gems – All 63 volumes of Spurgeon's sermons in today's language
 The Complete C H Spurgeon Collection including Spurgeon Sermon Notes; Devotional
 Spurgeon quotes
 Autobiography of Charles Spurgeon, volume 1
 Autobiography of Charles Spurgeon, volume 2
 Autobiography of Charles Spurgeon, volume 3
 Autobiography of Charles Spurgeon, volume 4
 Charles Haddon Spurgeon, A Biography – By William Young Fullerton
 Traits of Character: Being Twenty-five Years' Literary and Personal Recollections, with a chapter on Spurgeon, by Eliza Rennie
 Spurgeon's College
 An archive or primary documents pertaining to the Downgrade Controversy
 Spurgeon – Morning and Evening – Android App
 Cheer For Life Reference noted the-annual-american-catalogue-cheer for life

1834 births
1892 deaths
19th-century English Baptist ministers
19th century in London
19th-century Calvinist and Reformed theologians
19th-century British writers
English Baptist theologians
Burials at West Norwood Cemetery
English Calvinist and Reformed theologians
Calvinist and Reformed hymnwriters
Baptist hymnwriters
Christianity in London
Deaths from nephritis
English expatriates in France
English evangelists
English hymnwriters
English sermon writers
People from Kelvedon
19th-century English musicians
British expatriates in France